Overbite refers to the extent of vertical overlap of the maxillary central incisors over the mandibular central incisors.

Overbite may also refer to:
 Overbite (Firefox extension), an extension for the Mozilla Firefox web browser.
 Overbite (Transformers), a character in the Transformers animated children's series.